Alfredo Moreno Charme (born August 4, 1956) is a Chilean diplomat and politician.

Charme was born in Valparaíso, Chile. He was the Minister of Foreign Affairs of Chile under President Sebastián Piñera.

References

External links

1956 births
Foreign ministers of Chile
Living people
People from Santiago
Chilean Ministers of Public Works